The Regional Books was a book series of topographical guides to the British regions published by Robert Hale and Company from 1952. It was edited by Brian Vesey-Fitzgerald.

In the 1970s they published a broader Regions of Britain series.

See also
 County Books series
 Portrait Books series

References

1950s books
Books about the United Kingdom
Robert Hale (publishers)
Series of non-fiction books
Robert Hale books